Howard Franklin Jeter (born March 6, 1947) is an American retired diplomat. From 2001 to 2003, Jeter served as U.S. Ambassador to Nigeria. Prior to this, Jeter represented the United States in a diplomatic capacity in Botswana, Lesotho, and Namibia.

Early life and education 
Jeter was born on March 6, 1947, in Maple Ridge, Union County, South Carolina. He had a brother, James Randolph Jeter, and a sister, Jacquelyn Jeter. He graduated from Sims High School in 1964 as the class valedictorian. 

He went on to earn a B.A. in Political Science from Morehouse College. Jeter later received an M.A. in International Relations and Comparative Politics from Columbia University and an M.A. in African Area Studies from the University of California, Los Angeles. 

Jeter was a legislative intern in the Georgia House of Representatives. From 1967 to 1968, Jeter studied abroad in Nantes, France, where his host family nicknamed him "Franc", supposedly because they found "Howard" to be too difficult to pronounce.

Career 
Jeter served as U.S. Ambassador to Botswana from 1993 to 1996. In July 1996, he was appointed Special Presidential Envoy for Liberia. He later served as Deputy Assistant Secretary for African Affairs from June 1999 to July 2000. During his career, Franklin also served as Charge d’Affaires, a.i. in Lesotho and Namibia.

Jeter served as U.S. Ambassador to Nigeria from January 18, 2001, to July 30, 2003. After retiring from a 24 year career at the Foreign Service in 2003, Jeter became the Principal at Four Ways Enterprise, LLC.

Personal life 
In addition to English, Jeter speaks Portuguese, Swahili, and French. Jeter is married and has two children.

References

External links
Howard Jeter oral history interview, 2009 October 11 Smithsonian Institution

1947 births
Living people
Ambassadors of the United States to Nigeria
Ambassadors of the United States to Botswana
Morehouse College alumni
Columbia University alumni
University of California, Los Angeles alumni
Ambassadors of the United States to Lesotho
African-American diplomats